Empress Xiaozhaoren (1653 – 18 March 1678), of the Manchu Bordered Yellow Banner Niohuru clan, was a posthumous name bestowed to the wife and second empress consort of Xuanye, the Kangxi Emperor. She was empress consort of China during the Qing dynasty from 1677 until her death in 1678.

Life
Empress Xiaozhaoren's personal name was not recorded in history.

Family background
 Father: Ebilun (d. 1673), served as one of the Four Regents of the Kangxi Emperor, and held the title of a first class duke
 Paternal grandfather: Eidu (1562–1621)
 Paternal grandmother: Aisin Gioro Mukushen (1595–1659), Nurhaci's fourth daughter
 Mother: Lady Šušu Gioro, a concubine
 Seven brothers
 First Elder brother: Sailin (塞林 三等侍卫), Third Class Imperial Guard
 Second Elder Brother : Unnamed
 Third younger Brother: Faka (法喀 ;17 May 1664– 9 February 1713), First Class Duke (一等公)
 Fourth Younger Brother: Yanzhu (颜珠 一等侍卫;b. 1665), First Class Imperial Guard
 Fifth Younger Brother: Fubao (富保 任二等侍卫;b.1678),Second Class Imperial Guard
 Sixth Younget Brother: Yinde, First Class Duke (尹德 一等公)
 Seventh younger brother: Alingga (1670–1716)
 One elder sister and four younger sisters
 First elder sister: Princess Consort of the Second Rank of Barin, wife of Zhashen (扎什)
Third younger sister: Noble Consort Wenxi (d. 1694)
Fourth younger sister: State duchess of the fourth rank, wife of Yunsheng (云升)
Fifth younger sister: First class viscountess, wife of Ayushen (阿玉什) from Bordered White Banner

Kangxi era
In 1665, Lady Niohuru entered the Forbidden City and became a mistress of the Kangxi Emperor. Lady Niohuru did not receive any rank or title initially. After the Kangxi Emperor's first empress consort, Empress Xiaochengren, died on 6 June 1674, the Kangxi Emperor did not elevate any of his consorts to the position of empress to replace her. On 18 September 1677, Lady Niohuru was first mentioned in official histories when the Kangxi Emperor instated her as new empress consort. As Empress, Lady Niohuru was in charge of the emperor's harem. She died on 18 March 1678 and was interred in the Jing Mausoleum of the Eastern Qing tombs alongside Empress Xiaochengren.

Titles
 During the reign of the Shunzhi Emperor (r. 1643–1661):
 Lady Niohuru (from 1653)
 During the reign of the Kangxi Emperor (r. 1661–1722):
 Empress (from 18 September 1677)
 Empress Xiaozhao (from 11 May 1678)
 During the reign of the Yongzheng Emperor (r. 1722–1735):
 Empress Xiaozhaoren (from July 1723)

See also
 Ranks of imperial consorts in China#Qing
 Royal and noble ranks of the Qing dynasty

Notes

References
 
 
 
 
 
 

1653 births
1678 deaths
Qing dynasty empresses
Manchu nobility
17th-century Chinese women
17th-century Chinese people
Consorts of the Kangxi Emperor
Deaths in childbirth